An Irish feudal barony was a customary title of nobility: the holder was always referred to as a Baron, but was not the holder of a peerage, and had no right to sit in the Irish House of Lords. In 1614 the Dublin Government noted that there were "diverse gentlemen" in Ireland who were called Baron, yet:  "Never was any of them  Lord Baron nor summoned to any Parliament".

History

In Ireland, most originally-feudal titular baronies have long disappeared through obsolescence or disuse. The Lordship of Fingal was granted to Walter de Lacy, Lord of Meath for seven knight's fees, "although the lords thereof hold elsewhere in capite", according to the unusual grant in 1208 by King John as Lord of Ireland, who allowed de Lacy to retain custody of his fees. Fingal at the time spread from the River Liffey to the River Delvin, north of Dublin, similar to the administrative boundary of today's County Fingal (minus Dublin City) created from part of County Dublin in 1994. A small number of other titular baronies also continued to exist either as submerged titles of members of the Peerages of Ireland, Great Britain or the United Kingdom, or as titles held by grand serjeanty, such as, originally, Fingal. Those few that thus survive at all are traditionally considered "incorporeal hereditaments", and may continue to exist as interests or estates in land, registrable as such upon conveyance or inheritance under the Registry of Deeds of the Government of Ireland, although increasingly these are seen today as titles held in gross as personal rights, and not as real interests in land.

Following a report by the Law Reform Commission, the system of feudal tenure as such, in so far as it had survived, was abolished by the Oireachtas in the Land and Conveyancing Law Reform Act (no. 27 of 2009); fee tail was also abolished . However, estates and interests in land, including incorporeal hereditaments, continue. Formerly registered or proven feudal titles with a solid root of title, and the submerged feudal titles of surviving Irish or British peers are not affected, and continue to exist as personal rights, now held in gross. However, the obsolete or unregistered feudal titles, and those that lapsed into desuetude after 1662, when the Irish Parliament passed the Abolition of Tenures Act, no longer exist as incorporeal hereditaments, nor as personal rights, and cannot be revived.

Examples of hereditary baronial knighthoods that remain in Ireland include the Knight of Glin and the Knight of Kerry.

List

See also
Barony (Ireland)
List of baronies of Ireland
English feudal barony
Scottish feudal barony
Scottish feudal lordship
Marcher lordship
Baron
Lord
List of baronies in the peerages of the British Isles
Feudalism

Sources
A View of the Legal Institutions, Honorary Hereditary Offices, and Feudal Baronies established in Ireland, by William Lynch, Fellow of the Society of Antiquaries, published by Longman, Rees, Orme, Brown, and Green, Paternoster Row, London, 1830.

References

Baronies by type
Peerage of Ireland
Barons
Feudalism in the British Isles
Titles
Noble titles
Lordship of Ireland
Feudal baronies in Europe